This is a list of alleged UFO sightings in the United States.

See also 
 List of UFO sightings

References

External links 
 

 
United States aviation-related lists
UFO-related lists